Government General Degree College, Mohanpur , also known as  Mohanpur College, established in 2015, is the government degree college in Mohanpur, Paschim Medinipur district. It offers undergraduate courses in arts and science. It is affiliated to Vidyasagar University.

Departments

Arts
Bengali
English
History
Philosophy
Sociology

Science
Botany
Zoology
Physiology

See also

References

External links
 
Vidyasagar University
University Grants Commission
National Assessment and Accreditation Council

Universities and colleges in Paschim Medinipur district
Colleges affiliated to Vidyasagar University
Educational institutions established in 2015
2015 establishments in West Bengal